Dogan Kımıllı is an architect and former Mayor of Isparta (Birth 19 June 1939 Isparta), Turkey.

Early life 

He attended primary and middle school in Isparta and completed high school in Kayseri, Turkey.  He later earned a Bachelor of Science degree in Architecture from the department of Macka Faculty of Architecture at Istanbul Technical University in 1961. 
Upon completion of his degree, he performed his military service where he was a reserve officer.  He received architectural training at the Kagithane School of Military Engineers and at Tekirdağ 571st Civil Engineering Unit from 1962 to 1964.

Architecture 

In 1966 he began his professional career by starting Kimilli Insaat Taahhut as an independent architect. His company sought contracting work in construction and provided architectural drawings.

As a founding member of the Aksu Energy and Trading Corporation, his company produced electrical energy that supplied government enterprises.

Politics 

Throughout his life, he remained devoted to public service.  In 1977, he was elected Mayor of Isparta from the Justice Party (AP).

He was supported by 70.01% of the voters and served from 1977 to 1980. From 1996 to 1999, he served as City President of the Isparta True Paty Party (DYP).

Personal life 

Dogan currently resides with his wife, Yuksel, in Isparta, Turkey.  He has 3 sons and 8 grandchildren.
He continues to work in the fields of energy, wood products, construction and contracting.

References 

 
 

Justice Party (Turkey) politicians
20th-century Turkish politicians
Democrat Party (Turkey, current) politicians
Turkish architects
Istanbul Technical University alumni
1939 births
Living people
People from Isparta